A pussyhat is a pink, crafted hat, created in large numbers by women involved with the United States 2017 Women's March. They are the result of the Pussyhat Project, a nationwide effort initiated by Krista Suh and Jayna Zweiman, a screenwriter and architect located in Los Angeles, to create pink hats to be worn at the march. 

In response to this call, crafters all over the United States began making these hats using patterns provided on the project Web site for use with either a knitting method, crocheting and even sewing with fabrics. The project's goal was to have one million hats handed out at the Washington March. The hats are made using pink yarns or fabrics and were originally designed to be a positive form of protest for Trump's inauguration by Krista Suh. Suh, from Los Angeles, wanted a hat for the cooler climate in Washington, D.C. and made a hat for herself to wear at the Women's March, realizing the potential: "We could all wear them, make a unified statement". One of the project founders, Jayna Zweiman, stated "I think it's resonating a lot because we're really saying that no matter who you are or where you are, you can be politically active." Suh and Zweiman worked with Kat Coyle, the owner of a local knitting supply shop called The Little Knittery, to come up with the original design. The project launched in November 2016 and quickly became popular on social media with over 100,000 downloads of the pattern to make the hat.

Name
The creators state that the name refers to the resemblance of the top corners of the hats to cat ears while also attempting to reclaim the term "pussy", a play on Trump's widely reported 2005 remarks that women would let him "grab them by the pussy." Many of the hats worn by marchers in Washington, D.C., were created by crafters who were unable to attend and wished them to be worn by those who could, to represent their presence. Those hats optionally contained notes from the crafters to the wearers, expressing support. They were distributed by the crafters, by yarn stores at the points of origin, carried to the event by marchers, and also distributed at the destination. The production of the hats caused reported shortages of pink knitting yarn across the United States. On the day of the march, NPR compared the hats to the "Make America Great Again" hats worn by Trump supporters, in that both represented groups that had at one point been politically marginalized; both sent "simultaneously unifying and antagonistic" messages; and both were simple in their messages.

Racism and transphobia charges

Critics have stated that the pink color of the pussyhats does not represent transgender women, or women of color whose "genitals are more likely to be brown than pink". The creators claim that the color pink actually represents the strong association of pink with femininity, as well as "caring, compassion, and love", not a representation of anatomy.

Professor Cáel Keegan, who teaches Women, Gender and Sexuality Studies at Grand Valley State University in Michigan, said the hat's reference to pink [vulvas] is suspect: "We know that any time feminism starts centering people based on anatomy, that gets kind of dangerous for trans people." He also stated that both cisgender women and transgender women are fighting for autonomy over their own bodies. The hat's allusion to the [vulva] also ignores the fact that some transgender women opt against undergoing gender-affirmation surgery. Keegan said that the pussyhat can promote the unconscious suggestion that only cisgender women are raped, which is untrue. He further explained, "A lot of the reasons [transgender women] are attacked is because they do not possess that piece of anatomy."

In popular culture
Pussyhats were featured months after the 2017 march on the Missoni fashion runway. Models were outfitted with pink hats combined with zigzag-striped ribbing as they walked the runway, and at the end of the show, Angela Missoni and celebrities wore the hats as well. She called the collection "pink is the new black" and donated some of the proceeds from the collection to the American Civil Liberties Union and the UN Refugee Agency. 

The hats appeared on the covers of Time magazine and The New Yorker. The New Yorker had a painting of an African-American woman wearing a knit pussyhat, flexing her bared arm on its February 6, 2017 cover, in the style of the woman on the 1943 We Can Do It! poster (often mistakenly referred to as Rosie the Riveter). The painting, named "The March", was created by Abigail Gray Swartz, who marched in Augusta, Maine. The image was subsequently made available for sale on prints, mugs, t-shirts and other items.

Saturday Night Live had several skits in which pussyhats appeared. Its January 21, 2017 episode showed a distressed Russian woman putting on a hat and tiptoeing behind Vladimir Putin as he talked about Russia's recent "purchase" of the United States via the election. Another episode, hosted by Jessica Chastain, showed Aidy Bryant in the audience wearing a pussyhat.

References

External links

 

Hats
2010s fashion
Pink symbols
Women's March
Vagina and vulva in art
2010s fads and trends
Feminism and transgender
Clothing in politics